TTFA may refer to:

 Thenoyltrifluoroacetone, a chemical compound used pharmacologically as a chelating agent
 Trinidad and Tobago Football Association, the governing body of association football in Trinidad and Tobago

Chelating agents